Zinado is a town in the Ganzourgou province of Burkina Faso.

Partnership
Verrières-le-Buisson in France

References

External links
 Verrières le Buisson Initiative (in French)

-

Populated places in the Plateau-Central Region